Raudondvaris is a village in Vilnius District Municipality, in Riešė Eldership. It is situated 15 kilometers north of Vilnius, near Lake Raudondvaris. The village houses a 18th/19th-century manor treasury, tower and park.

References 

Villages in Vilnius County
Vilnius District Municipality